Jeffrey Alan Hartings (born September 7, 1972) is a former American college and professional football player who was a center in the National Football League (NFL) for eleven seasons. He played college football at Penn State University, and earned all-American honors. A first-round pick of the Detroit Lions in the 1996 NFL Draft, he played professionally for the Lions and Pittsburgh Steelers. He was a member of the Steelers' Super Bowl championship team in 2005, beating the Seattle Seahawks, and he was a two-time Pro Bowl selection. He is currently the head football coach at Worthington Christian High School

Early years
Hartings was born in St. Henry, Ohio.  He attended St. Henry High School, and was a letterwinner in football as a two-way starter and in track and field. In football, he was a two-time all-conference selection, helped lead his team to the state championship as a senior, and compiled 23 sacks and 200 tackles. After his senior season, he participated in the Ohio North-South Game.

College career
Hartings attended Penn State University, where he played for coach Joe Paterno's Penn State Nittany Lions football team from 1992 to 1995. He was a first-team All-American in 1994 and 1995, garnering consensus first-team honors in 1995. He graduated from Penn State with a Bachelor of Science degree in marketing in 1995 and was twice honored as an Academic All-American.

Professional career

He was selected to the Pro Bowl in 2004 and 2005. Hartings retired following the 2006 season, citing recurring knee problems.

Coaching career
In April 2017, Hartings was named the head football coach at Worthington Christian High School.

Personal life
Hartings is one of ten children. A born-again Christian, he has performed missionary work in Nicaragua and helped to start a new non-denominational church with former Detroit Lions teammate Luther Elliss. Since his retirement, he and his wife Rebecca live in Pittsburgh, Pennsylvania and Columbus, Ohio with their eight children, Sierra, Michael, Lucas, Mianna, Isabella, Jullexa, Jovanna and Malachi.

Jeff Hartings was a high school teammate and graduating classmate of former Ohio State, Philadelphia Eagle, and Oakland Raider quarterback Bobby Hoying at St. Henry High School, a school with an average graduating class of about 100 students. St. Henry High School also produced accomplished former NFL offensive tackle Jim Lachey.

References

External links
Pittsburgh Steelers Profile
Jeff Hartings at NFL.com

1972 births
Living people
All-American college football players
American Conference Pro Bowl players
American football centers
Detroit Lions players
Penn State Nittany Lions football players
People from St. Henry, Ohio
Pittsburgh Steelers players